Unión is a village in the Guanacaste Province, Costa Rica. It is located on the east shore of Lake Arenal. Nearby, to the north of the village are the Arenal Botanical Gardens.

References

Lake Arenal
Populated places in Guanacaste Province